Epigondolella is an extinct genus of conodonts in the family Gondolellidae.

Synonyms 
Mazzaella is a new genus for Epigondolella carnica Krystyn (1975).

Use in stratigraphy 
The top of the Norian (or the base of the Rhaetian, in the Late Triassic) is close to the first appearances of the conodonts Misikella spp. and Epigondolella mosheri.

References

External links 

 
 

Ozarkodinida genera
Late Triassic fish
Triassic conodonts